Joseph Gaétan Robert Gérald (Gerry) Boulet (March 1, 1946 – July 18, 1990) was a French Canadian rock singer. Most famous as vocalist for the Quebec rock band Offenbach, he also released two solo albums. He is considered one of the innovators of rock music in the joual language of French Quebec.

Career
Born and raised in Saint-Jean-sur-Richelieu, he started in music with the band Les Gants Blancs (literally "The White Gloves"), which evolved into Offenbach, in 1969.

In 1985, Boulet recorded his first solo album, Presque 40 ans de blues. The following year, the band performed a farewell concert at the Montreal Forum.

In 1987 he was diagnosed with colon cancer. Boulet released his second solo album, Rendez-vous doux, in 1989. Some songs in this album clearly talk about his fight to stay alive. The album won him three Félix Awards in 1989 for Best Rock Album, Best Rock Concert and Best Television Special; in 1990, he won two more posthumous Félix Awards, including Song of the Year for "Un beau grand bateau" and a special tribute award. Rendez-vous doux held the title of the best-selling album of all time by a Québécois artist through the early 1990s, until it was surpassed in 1996 by Céline Dion's D'eux.

On July 18, 1990, Boulet died in Montreal of cancer.

Legacy
In 1991 his solo debut was reissued under the new title Gerry, while in 1994 Dan Bigras produced a recording of Boulet's previously unreleased rock opera Jézabel.

Offenbach reunited in 1996, with Martin Deschamps on vocals. In 1998, the live album Gerry Boulet...en rappel was released.

Gerry, a biographical film about his life, was launched in theatres on June 15, 2011. The film was directed by Alain DesRochers, and stars Mario Saint-Amand as Boulet.

Discography

 Presque 40 ans de blues (1984)
 Rendez-vous doux (1988)
 Gerry (1991)
 Jézabel (1994)
 Gerry Boulet...en rappel (1998)

References

External links
  Gerry Boulet

1946 births
1990 deaths
20th-century Canadian male singers
Canadian rock singers
Deaths from cancer in Quebec
French Quebecers
French-language singers of Canada
People from Saint-Jean-sur-Richelieu
Singers from Quebec